uMngeni Local Municipality is an administrative area in the UMgungundlovu District of KwaZulu-Natal in South Africa.

The municipality is named after the Umgeni River that runs through the municipal area.

Main places
The 2011 census divided the municipality into the following main places:

Politics 

The municipal council consists of twenty-five members elected by mixed-member proportional representation. Twelve councilors are elected by first-past-the-post voting in twelve wards, while the remaining are chosen from party lists so that the total number of party representatives is proportional to the number of votes received. In the 2021 South African municipal elections the Democratic Alliance (DA) won a majority of thirteen seats in the council.

The following table shows the results of the 2021 election.

References

External links
 http://www.umngeni.gov.za/

Local municipalities of the Umgungundlovu District Municipality